Schopfheim West station is a railway station in the municipality of Schopfheim, in Baden-Württemberg, Germany. It is located on standard gauge Wiese Valley Railway of Deutsche Bahn.

Services
 the following services stop at Schopfheim West:

 Basel S-Bahn:

References

External links
 
 

Railway stations in Baden-Württemberg
Buildings and structures in Lörrach (district)